These are the results of the November 6, 2005, municipal elections in Quebec for the region of Bas-Saint-Laurent. Some mayors and councillors were elected without opposition from October 14, 2005.

Albertville
Electors: 269
Voters: 211 (78%)
Councillors 1, 3, 4 and 6 were elected without opposition.
 Mayor: Martin Landry
 Councillor 1: Sylvain Chabot
 Councillor 2: Mario Lacasse
 Councillor 3: Alain Daigle
 Councillor 4: Irenée Charest
 Councillor 5: Roger Durette
 Councillor 6: Gilberte Potvin

Amqui
Electors: 5 039
Voters: 2 448 (49%)
Councillors 1, 2, 4 and 6 were elected without opposition.
 Mayor: Gaëtan Ruest
 Councillor 1: Monique Vermette-Leclerc
 Councillor 2: Normand Boulianne
 Councillor 3: Jean-François Guay
 Councillor 4: Germain Boulianne
 Councillor 5: Jocelyn Lévesque
 Councillor 6: Jacques Pelletier

Auclair
Mayor and councillors 2, 3, 4, 5 and 6 were elected without opposition.
 Mayor: Jean-Guy Robert
 Councillor 1: Nathalie Belzile
 Councillor 2: Doris Lévesque
 Councillor 3: Camille A. Lavoie
 Councillor 4: Sylvain St-Amant
 Councillor 5: Bruno Bonesso
 Councillor 6: France Lavoie

Baie-des-Sables
All elected without opposition.
 Mayor: Jacques Couillard
 Councillor 1: Odette St-Laurent
 Councillor 2: Yvan Bélanger
 Councillor 3: Régis Dionne
 Councillor 4: Claudie Fillion
 Councillor 5: Martin Pelletier
 Councillor 6: Jacques Fournier

Biencourt
Electors: 507
Voters: 374 (74%)
Councillors 3, 4 and 5 were elected without opposition.
 Mayor: Daniel Boucher
 Councillor 1: Robert Dumont
 Councillor 2: Roland Lajoie
 Councillor 3: Raymond Lavoie
 Councillor 4: Yvon Tremblay
 Councillor 5: Simon Bélanger
 Councillor 6: Linda Lavoie

Cabano
All elected without opposition.
 Mayor: Jacques Asselin
 Councillor 1: Ghislain Thériault
 Councillor 2: Jean-Baptiste Soucy
 Councillor 3: Roland Martin
 Councillor 4: Gilbert Hudon
 Councillor 5: Claudette Tardif
 Councillor 6: Anne-Marie Morin

Causapscal
Electors: 1 989
Voters: 1 340 (67%)
 Mayor: Denis Bastien
 Councillor 1: Jean-Yves Charbonneau
 Councillor 2: Mario Côté
 Councillor 3: Cynthia Rivard
 Councillor 4: Raymond Tremblay
 Councillor 5: Claude Dufour
 Councillor 6: Nancy Bérubé

Dégelis
Mayor and councillors 1, 2, 3, 4 and 5 were elected without opposition.
 Mayor: Émilien Nadeau
 Councillor 1: Normand Morin
 Councillor 2: Carole Pedneault
 Councillor 3: Claude Lavoie
 Councillor 4: Denis Clermont
 Councillor 5: Benoit Dumont
 Councillor 6: Yves LeBel

Esprit-Saint
Mayor and councillors 1, 3, 4 and 5 were elected without opposition.
 Mayor: Marlène Dubé
 Councillor 1: Richard Ouellet
 Councillor 2: Gérald Mailloux
 Councillor 3: Gérald Ouellet
 Councillor 4: Lucienne Bouchard
 Councillor 5: Marie-Reine Turcotte
 Councillor 6: Robin Simon

Grand-Métis
All elected without opposition.
 Mayor: Richard Fournier
 Councillor 1: Stuart Craig
 Councillor 2: Vacancy
 Councillor 3: Vacancy
 Councillor 4: Raymond L'Arrivée
 Councillor 5: Vacancy
 Councillor 6: Vacancy

Grosses-Roches
Electors: 374
Voters: 244 (65%)
Councillor 6 was elected without opposition
 Mayor: Victoire Marin
 Councillor 1: Nelson Marin
 Councillor 2: Sylvain Tremblay
 Councillor 3: Pâquerette Coulombe
 Councillor 4: Michel Langlois
 Councillor 5: Michel Boulay
 Councillor 6: Gilbert Fournier

Kamouraska
Mayor and councillors 1, 2, 4, 5 and 6 were elected without opposition.
 Mayor: Claude Langlais
 Councillor 1: Guy Dionne
 Councillor 2: Bernard Labrie
 Councillor 3: Gilles. A Michaud
 Councillor 4: Rémi Dionne
 Councillor 5: Hervé Voyer
 Councillor 6: Robert Caughie

La Pocatière
All elected without opposition.
 Mayor: Bernard Généreux
 Councillor 1: Lise Garneau
 Councillor 2: Pierre Darveau
 Councillor 3: Sylvain Hudon
 Councillor 4: Louise Lacoursière
 Councillor 5: Daniel Dubé
 Councillor 6: Steve Leclerc

La Rédemption
Electors: 398
Voters: 240 (60%)
Councillors 2, 3 and 4 were elected without opposition
 Mayor: Viateur Labonté
 Councillor 1: Gino Morissette
 Councillor 2: Carmen Morisset
 Councillor 3: Mario Mongeon
 Councillor 4: Patricia Lavoie
 Councillor 5: Madeleine Perreault
 Councillor 6: Alain Paquet

La Trinité-des-Monts
All elected without opposition.
 Mayor: Raymond Martin
 Councillor 1: Brigitte Brillant
 Councillor 2: Normand Labelle
 Councillor 3: Carmen Dumont
 Councillor 4: Hélène Beaudoin
 Councillor 5: Marcelle Denoncourt
 Councillor 6: Elphège Lebel

Lac-au-Saumon
Electors: 1 168
Voters: 571 (49%)
Councillors 1, 4, 5 and 6 were elected without opposition
 Mayor: Jean-Claude Dumoulin
 Councillor 1: Francis St-Laurent
 Councillor 2: Normand Gallant
 Councillor 3: Carmen Bilodeau
 Councillor 4: Jean-Guy Pelletier
 Councillor 5: Rosaire Côté
 Councillor 6: André Gaudet

La Trinité-des-Monts
Mayor and councillors 1, 2 and 3 were elected without opposition.
 Mayor: Claude Breault
 Councillor 1: Michel Dubé
 Councillor 2: Micheline Bouchard
 Councillor 3: Nicole Beaulieu
 Councillor 4: André Bruno Rodrigue
 Councillor 5: Marie-Claude Robichaud
 Councillor 6: Elzéar Lepage

Le Bic
Electors: 2 326
Voters: 1 603 (69%)
Councillor 5 was elected without opposition
 Mayor: Jean-Louis Lavoie
 Councillor 1: David Legaré
 Councillor 2: Sylvain Trudel
 Councillor 3: Patrick Bérubé
 Councillor 4: Christiane Parent
 Councillor 5: Ghislain D'Astous
 Councillor 6: Camil Harvey

Lejeune
All elected without opposition.
 Mayor: Lucie Gilbert
 Councillor 1: Mario Lebel
 Councillor 2: Réjean Albert
 Councillor 3: Fernand Albert
 Councillor 4: Bruno Dubé
 Councillor 5: Adrien Bourgoin
 Councillor 6: Norbert Michaud

Les Hauteurs
Mayor and councillors 1, 3 and 6 were elected without opposition.
 Mayor: Sylvain Dupont
 Councillor 1: Jacques Richard
 Councillor 2: Denise Caron
 Councillor 3: Pierre Lechasseur
 Councillor 4: Nelson Claveau
 Councillor 5: Gitane Michaud
 Councillor 6: Réginald Michaud

Les Méchins
Electors: 1 019
Voters: 636 (62%)
Councillors 3 and 4 were elected without opposition
 Mayor: Donald Grenier
 Councillor 1: Francine Verreault
 Councillor 2: Clément Marceau
 Councillor 3: Gaston Bouchard
 Councillor 4: Réal Isabel
 Councillor 5: Jacques Tremblay
 Councillor 6: Jocelyne Sergerie

L'Isle-Verte
Electors: 1 224
Voters: 702 (57%)
Councillors 1, 2, 3, 4 and 5 were elected without opposition
 Mayor: Serge Forest
 Councillor 1: Roland Vaillancourt
 Councillor 2: Jean Pelletier
 Councillor 3: Julie Dubé
 Councillor 4: Christian Pettigrew
 Councillor 5: Valois Caron
 Councillor 6: Yves Côté

Matane
Electors: 1 224
Voters: 702 (57%)
Councillor 1 was elected without opposition
 Mayor: Linda Cormier
 Councillor 1: Jérôme Landry
 Councillor 2: Bertrand Bernier
 Councillor 3: France Caron
 Councillor 4: Mario Coté
 Councillor 5: Michel Savard
 Councillor 6: Mario Hamilton
 Councillor 7: Victor Truchon
 Councillor 8: Guy A. Gauthier

Métis-sur-Mer
Mayor and councillors 1, 2, 3, 4 and 6 were elected without opposition.
 Mayor: Raymond Tremblay
 Councillor 1: Jean-Pierre Pelletier
 Councillor 2: Lysanne Desrosiers
 Councillor 3: Jean-Baptiste Lavoie
 Councillor 4: June Smith
 Councillor 5: Raynald Banville
 Councillor 6: Rita Dufour Turriff

Mont-Carmel
Electors: 1 069
Voters: 693 (65%)
 Mayors: Denis Boucher and Yvon Soucy
 Councillor 1: Yves Gagnon
 Councillor 2: Marco Dionne
 Councillor 3: Nancy Drapeau
 Councillor 4: Denis Kronstrom
 Councillor 5: Pierre Massé
 Councillor 6: Marie-Chantal Savoie

Mont-Joli
Electors: 5 067
Voters: 2 608 (51%)
Councillors 1, 2, 3, 6 and 7 were elected without opposition
 Mayor: Jean Bélanger
 Councillor 1: Gilles Lavoie
 Councillor 2: Vallier April
 Councillor 3: Gaétan Beaulieu
 Councillor 4: Jean-Pierre Labonté
 Councillor 5: Marcel Dubé
 Councillor 6: Denis Dubé
 Councillor 7: Steeve Page
 Councillor 8: Vacancy

Notre-Dame-des-Neiges
Electors: 1 211
Voters: 602 (50%)
Councillors 2, 3, 4 and 5 were elected without opposition
 Mayor: Gérard Beaulieu
 Councillor 1: Hector Jean
 Councillor 2: Carmen Nicole
 Councillor 3: Yvon Bélanger
 Councillor 4: Nancy Lafond
 Councillor 5: Philippe Leclerc
 Councillor 6: Christiane Thériault

Notre-Dame-des-Sept-Douleurs
Electors: 144
Voters: 130 (90%)
All councillors were elected without opposition
 Mayor: Gilbert Delage
 Councillor 1: Charles Méthé
 Councillor 2: Francis Michaud
 Councillor 3: Brigitte Émond
 Councillor 4: Louise Newbury
 Councillor 5: Vacancy
 Councillor 6: Vacancy

Notre-Dame-du-Lac
Electors: 1 613
Voters: 1 113 (69%)
Councillors 3, 4 and 6 were elected without opposition
 Mayor: Gilles Garon
 Councillor 1: Marie Tardif
 Councillor 2: Jacques Charest
 Councillor 3: Pierre Dufour
 Councillor 4: Michel Robichaud
 Councillor 5: Gilles Michaud
 Councillor 6: Magella Beaulieu

Notre-Dame-du-Portage
Electors: 1 032
Voters: 651 (63%)
Councillors 2, 3 and 6 were elected without opposition
 Mayor: Nathalie Tremblay
 Councillor 1: Pauline Gagnon
 Councillor 2: Richard Dubé
 Councillor 3: Stéphane Fraser
 Councillor 4: Daniel Malenfant
 Councillor 5: Carl Bélanger
 Councillor 6: Jean-Guy Pelletier

Packington
All elected without opposition.
 Mayor: Michel Lacasse
 Councillor 1: Denise Levesque
 Councillor 2: Gaétane Dumont
 Councillor 3: Lionel Mailloux
 Councillor 4: Milton Thériault
 Councillor 5: Benoit Dubé
 Councillor 6: Marie-Paule Beaulieu

Padoue
All elected without opposition.
 Mayor: Pierre Dufort
 Councillor 1: Marie-Lourdes Durette
 Councillor 2: Pierre-Paul Ouellet
 Councillor 3: Gilbert Rioux
 Councillor 4: Marc Desrosiers
 Councillor 5: François Doré
 Councillor 6: Bertrand Caron

Pohénégamook
Electors: 2 399
Voters: 1 624 (68%)
Councillors 3, 5 and 6 were elected without opposition
 Mayor: Guy Leblanc
 Councillor 1: Louise Bérubé
 Councillor 2: Nancy Morin
 Councillor 3: Louise Labonté
 Councillor 4: Marie-Christine Thériault
 Councillor 5: Jean Émond
 Councillor 6: Robert Labrecque

Price
Mayor and councillors 1, 2, 3, 4 and 6 were elected without opposition
 Mayor: Claude Dupont
 Councillor 1: Michel Deroy
 Councillor 2: Fabien Boucher
 Councillor 3: Steeve Belzile
 Councillor 4: Simon Pineau
 Councillor 5: Jean-Roch Lantagne
 Councillor 6: Lise Lévesque

Rimouski
Electors: 33 516
Voters: 14 802 (44%)
 Mayor: Éric Forest
 Councillor 1: Marc St-Laurent
 Councillor 2: Rodrigue Joncas
 Councillor 3: Claude Mongrain
 Councillor 4: Richard Caissy
 Councillor 5: Raymond-Marie Murray
 Councillor 6: Donald Bélanger
 Councillor 7: Gisèle Saint-Pierre-Beaulieu
 Councillor 8: Pierre Tourville
 Councillor 9: Karol Francis
 Councillor 10: Francis Proulx

Rivière-Bleue
All elected without opposition.
 Mayor: Marcel Landry
 Councillor 1: Jean-Pierre Beaulieu
 Councillor 2: Claudine Marquis
 Councillor 3: Christiane Roy
 Councillor 4: Jean-Guy Bossé
 Councillor 5: Gaétan Grand'Maison
 Councillor 6: Hermann Fortin

Rivière-du-Loup
Mayor and councillors 1, 3 and 4 were elected without opposition
 Mayor: Jean D'Amour
 Councillor 1: Jacques Thériault
 Councillor 2: Gaétan St-Pierre
 Councillor 3: Denis Tardif
 Councillor 4: Hervé Bouchard
 Councillor 5: Claude Pelletier
 Councillor 6: Sylvie Vignet

Rivière-Ouelle
All elected without opposition.
 Mayor: Roger Richard
 Councillor 1: Gilles Levesque
 Councillor 2: Marie-Pierre Richard
 Councillor 3: Gilles Hudon
 Councillor 4: Éric Bérubé
 Councillor 5: Daniel Scherer
 Councillor 6: Dominic Morin

Saint-Adelme
Mayor and councillors 2, 3, 4, 5 and 6 were elected without opposition
 Mayor: Yvan Imbeault
 Councillor 1: Francine Gagné
 Councillor 2: Johanne Thibeault
 Councillor 3: Marcel Gauthier
 Councillor 4: Marie Dextraze
 Councillor 5: Marc Gauthier
 Councillor 6: Wilbrod Gagné

Saint-Alexandre-de-Kamouraska
All elected without opposition.
 Mayor: Jean-Simon Bélanger
 Councillor 1: Paul Labrie
 Councillor 2: Réal Garon
 Councillor 3: William G. Grenier
 Councillor 4: Michel Soucy
 Councillor 5: Éric Boulianne
 Councillor 6: Daniel Gosselin

Saint-Alexandre-des-Lacs
Electors: 268
Voters: 179 (67%)
All councillors were elected without opposition.
 Mayor: Jean-Marc Roy
 Councillor 1: Nelson Pilote
 Councillor 2: Gilbert Leclerc
 Councillor 3: Aubin Jomphe
 Councillor 4: Gilles Roussel
 Councillor 5: Germain Lamarre
 Councillor 6: Jean-Louis Paquet

Saint-Anaclet-de-Lessard
Electors: 2 103
Voters: 836 (40%)
All councillors were elected without opposition.
 Mayor: Raoul Gagnon
 Councillor 1: Claire Lepage
 Councillor 2: Éric Poirier
 Councillor 3: Francis St-Pierre
 Councillor 4: Hector St-Laurent
 Councillor 5: Carole N. Côté
 Councillor 6: Francis Rodrigue

Saint-André
Mayor and councillors 4 and 6 were elected without opposition
 Mayor: Paul-Louis Martin
 Councillor 1: André Lapointe
 Councillor 2: Robert Moore
 Councillor 3: Vivianne Villeneuve
 Councillor 4: Charlotte Roberge
 Councillor 5: Claude Ouellet
 Councillor 6: Serge Binet

Saint-Antonin
Electors: 2 823
Voters: 1 687 (60%)
 Mayor: Réal Thibault
 Councillor 1: Mario Fortin
 Councillor 2: Réal Landry
 Councillor 3: Eugène Larochelle
 Councillor 4: Marco Després
 Councillor 5: Denis Fortin
 Councillor 6: René Boismenu

Saint-Arsène
Mayor and councillors 1, 3, 4 and 6 were elected without opposition
 Mayor: Gaétan Michaud
 Councillor 1: Véronique Dionne
 Councillor 2: Raynald Caillouette
 Councillor 3: Pierre Bérubé
 Councillor 4: Frédéric Jean
 Councillor 5: Josée Lavoie
 Councillor 6: Claire Lemieux-Bérubé

Saint-Athanase
All elected without opposition.
 Mayor: Mario Patry
 Councillor 1: Francis Morin
 Councillor 2: Jocelyn Bernier
 Councillor 3: Vacancy
 Councillor 4: Marie-Ève Bouchard
 Councillor 5: Serge Caron
 Councillor 6: Gaston Chénard

Saint-Bruno-de-Kamouraska
Electors: 598
Voters: 383 (64%)
All councillors were elected without opposition.
 Mayor: Gilles Bois
 Councillor 1: Denise Lévesque
 Councillor 2: Donald Larochelle
 Councillor 3: André Simard
 Councillor 4: Gérard Dionne
 Councillor 5: Michel Gagné
 Councillor 6: Ghislain Dionne

Saint-Charles-Garnier
Electors: 258
Voters: 202 (78%)
Councillor 4 was elected without opposition.
 Mayor: Daniel Nadeau
 Councillor 1: Réjeanne Michaud
 Councillor 2: Jean-Pierre Bélanger
 Councillor 3: Nancy Pineault
 Councillor 4: Rodrigue Ouellet
 Councillor 5: Marc-André Béland
 Councillor 6: Jordane Proulx

Saint-Clément
All elected without opposition.
 Mayor: Aliette April
 Councillor 1: Flavius Roy
 Councillor 2: Marco Sénéchal
 Councillor 3: Noëlla Dumas
 Councillor 4: Pierre Gagné
 Councillor 5: Fabien Cayouette
 Councillor 6: Martin Roy

Saint-Cléophas
All elected without opposition.
 Mayor: Lise Dompierre
 Councillor 1: Daniel Charest
 Councillor 2: Marcel Bélanger
 Councillor 3: Michel Santerre
 Councillor 4: Bruno Gauvin
 Councillor 5: Stéphane Boulanger
 Councillor 6: Julie Turcotte

Saint-Cyprien
All elected without opposition.
 Mayor: Michel Lagacé
 Councillor 1: Martin Ouellet
 Councillor 2: Alain Denis
 Councillor 3: Blondin Ouellet
 Councillor 4: Josée Roy
 Councillor 5: Véronique Malenfant
 Councillor 6: Monique Malenfant

Saint-Damase
All elected without opposition.
 Mayor: Bertrand Lavoie
 Councillor 1: Marjolaine Dubé-D'Astous
 Councillor 2: Herman Gendron
 Councillor 3: Viateur Robichaud
 Councillor 4: Chantal Gendron
 Councillor 5: France Gagné
 Councillor 6: Roger Paquet

Saint-Denis
All elected without opposition.
 Mayor: Mireille Dionne-Bérubé
 Councillor 1: Alain Pelletier
 Councillor 2: Christian Lévesque
 Councillor 3: Claude Morin
 Councillor 4: Jacques Michot
 Councillor 5: Gaétan Garon
 Councillor 6: Lynda Lizotte

Saint-Donat
Electors: 713
Voters: 279 (39%)
All councillors were elected without opposition.
 Mayor: Michel Côté
 Councillor 1: Patrick Legoupil
 Councillor 2: Pierre Gauthier
 Councillor 3: André Lechasseur
 Councillor 4: Johanne Canuel
 Councillor 5: Raynald Demers
 Councillor 6: Réjean Gagné

Sainte-Angèle-de-Mérici
Councillors 1 and 5 were elected without opposition.
 Mayor: Vacancy
 Councillor 1: Stéphane Ouellet
 Councillor 2: Vacancy
 Councillor 3: Vacancy
 Councillor 4: Alain Carrier
 Councillor 5: Michel Canuel
 Councillor 6: Donald Côté

Sainte-Anne-de-la-Pocatière
All elected without opposition.
 Mayor: Michel Chouinard
 Councillor 1: Philippe Roy
 Councillor 2: Martine Hudon
 Councillor 3: Dominique Bélanger
 Councillor 4: Alphée Pelletier
 Councillor 5: Carole Lévesque
 Councillor 6: Luc Martin Deroy

Sainte-Félicité
Electors: 984
Voters: 637 (65%)
All councillors were elected without opposition.
 Mayor: Réginald Desrosiers
 Councillor 1: Jimmy Marceau
 Councillor 2: Pierre Simard
 Councillor 3: Léonce Sioui
 Councillor 4: Fidélio Simard
 Councillor 5: André Lefrançois
 Councillor 6: Rémi Savard

Sainte-Flavie
All elected without opposition.
 Mayor: Léon Gaudreault
 Councillor 1: Jean-Yves Roy
 Councillor 2: Jean-François Fortin
 Councillor 3: Michel Hudon
 Councillor 4: Katia Beaulieu
 Councillor 5: Françoise Arsenault
 Councillor 6: Gilberte Lecours

Sainte-Florence
Electors: 396
Voters: 198 (50%)
Councillors 1, 2, 3, 4 and 5 were elected without opposition.
 Mayor: Réjeanne Doiron
 Councillor 1: Pierrette Bérubé
 Councillor 2: Lauraine Gendron
 Councillor 3: Nelson Barrest
 Councillor 4: Louise Beaupré
 Councillor 5: Gisèle Gagnon
 Councillor 6: Claude Marineau

Sainte-Françoise
All elected without opposition.
 Mayor: Bernard D'Amours
 Councillor 1: Steve Deschenes
 Councillor 2: Vacancy
 Councillor 3: Simon Lavoie
 Councillor 4: Vianney D'Amours
 Councillor 5: Vacancy
 Councillor 6: Pierre Morin

Sainte-Hélène
All elected without opposition.
 Mayor: Vacancy
 Councillor 1: Blaise Bérubé
 Councillor 2: Jacques Laplante
 Councillor 3: Vacancy
 Councillor 4: Jacques St-Pierre
 Councillor 5: Vacancy
 Councillor 6: Joël Moreau

Sainte-Irène
Electors: 294
Voters: 182 (62%)
Councillors 1, 5 and 6 were elected without opposition.
 Mayor: Alain Duchemin
 Councillor 1: Sylvie Chenel
 Councillor 2: Huguette Desjardins
 Councillor 3: Dany Lavoie
 Councillor 4: Mario Jean
 Councillor 5: Michel Garneau
 Councillor 6: Hervé St-Onge

Sainte-Jeanne-d'Arc
Electors: 331
Voters: 219 (66%)
Councillors 2 and 6 were elected without opposition.
 Mayor: Maurice Chrétien
 Councillor 1: René Desrosiers
 Councillor 2: Isabelle Coulombe
 Councillor 3: Gervais Chamberland
 Councillor 4: Rodrigue Roy
 Councillor 5: Raymonde Levesque
 Councillor 6: Francis Pelletier

Saint-Éloi
All elected without opposition.
 Mayor: Alain Lepage
 Councillor 1: Jean-Marc Pettigrew
 Councillor 2: Francine Labelle
 Councillor 3: Lisette Jean
 Councillor 4: Jocelyn Côté
 Councillor 5: Mario St-Louis
 Councillor 6: Jocelyn Rioux

Sainte-Luce
All elected without opposition.
 Mayor: Vacancy
 Councillor 1: Hugues Dionne
 Councillor 2: Michaël Ouellet
 Councillor 3: Vacancy
 Councillor 4: Pierre Laplante
 Councillor 5: Anne A. Racine
 Councillor 6: France St-Laurent

Saint-Elzéar-de-Témiscouata
Mayor and councillors 1, 2, 3, 4 and 5 were elected without opposition
 Mayor: Réjean Deschênes
 Councillor 1: Guy Thibault
 Councillor 2: Steve Ouellet
 Councillor 3: Rino Caron
 Councillor 4: Ghislain Sirois
 Councillor 5: Léona Morin
 Councillor 6: Pauline Thibault

Sainte-Marguerite
All elected without opposition.
 Mayor: Marlène Landry
 Councillor 1: David Pelletier
 Councillor 2: Claudette Aubé
 Councillor 3: Nicole Lejeune
 Councillor 4: Sylvain Carrier
 Councillor 5: Roland Marquis
 Councillor 6: Gaétan Thériault

Sainte-Paule
All elected without opposition.
 Mayor: Yvan Côté
 Councillor 1: Barbara Lehouillier
 Councillor 2: Gérard Tremblay
 Councillor 3: Adrien Pelletier
 Councillor 4: Alfred D'Amours
 Councillor 5: Victor Sirois
 Councillor 6: Richard Nadeau

Saint-Épiphane
Electors: 650
Voters: 289 (44%)
All councillors were elected without opposition.
 Mayor: Jean-Pierre Gratton
 Councillor 1: Marie-Claude Saindon
 Councillor 2: Alain Caron
 Councillor 3: Hervé Dubé
 Councillor 4: Gérald Lebel
 Councillor 5: Jean-Claude Jalbert
 Councillor 6: Marcel Rouleau

Sainte-Rita
Councillors 1, 2, 4, 5 and 6 were elected without opposition
 Mayor: Alain St-Pierre
 Councillor 1: Martine Dubé
 Councillor 2: Denis Dubé
 Councillor 3: Jean Pierre
 Councillor 4: Lauréanne Beaulieu
 Councillor 5: Francine Ouellet
 Councillor 6: Jacques Beaulieu

Saint-Eugène-de-Ladrière
All elected without opposition.
 Mayor: Gilbert Pigeon
 Councillor 1: Guy Viel
 Councillor 2: Yvon Gagnon
 Councillor 3: Stéphane Berger
 Councillor 4: Sébastien Belzile
 Councillor 5: Guy Berger
 Councillor 6: Pascal D'Astous

Saint-Eusèbe
All elected without opposition.
 Mayor: Gaston Chouinard
 Councillor 1: Gilles Pellerin
 Councillor 2: Marco Beaulieu
 Councillor 3: André Lebrun
 Councillor 4: Alain Dubé
 Councillor 5: Émilien Deschamps
 Councillor 6: Gaspard Lajoie

Saint-Fabien
Electors: 1 637
Voters: 985 (60%)
 Mayor: Jacques Carrier
 Councillor 1: Vacancy
 Councillor 2: Guy Rioux
 Councillor 3: Gaétane Berger
 Councillor 4: Alain Jean
 Councillor 5: Vacancy
 Councillor 6: Vacancy

Saint-François-Xavier-de-Viger
Electors: 297
Voters: 176 (59%)
Councillors 1, 2, 3 and 6 were elected without opposition.
 Mayor: Raymond Dubé
 Councillor 1: Jean Bernier
 Councillor 2: Robin Boucher
 Councillor 3: Jacques Jalbert
 Councillor 4: Yvon Caron
 Councillor 5: Edmond Plourde
 Councillor 6: Jean-Rock Boucher

Saint-Gabriel-de-Rimouski
Mayor and councillors 1, 2, 3, 5 and 6 were elected without opposition
 Mayor: Jean-Clément Ouellet
 Councillor 1: Marie-Josée Dubé
 Councillor 2: Viateur Boucher
 Councillor 3: Stéphane Deschênes
 Councillor 4: Raymond Lévesque
 Councillor 5: Claudette D.-Côté
 Councillor 6: Bruno Boucher

Saint-Gabriel-Lalemant
Electors: 703
Voters: 488 (69%)
Councillors 2, 4 and 5 were elected without opposition.
 Mayor: Raymond Chouinard
 Councillor 1: Denis Milliard
 Councillor 2: Marc-André Lévesque
 Councillor 3: Alain Danjou
 Councillor 4: Michel Larose
 Councillor 5: Jean-Yves Danjou
 Councillor 6: Jean-Paul Milliard

Saint-Germain
All elected without opposition.
 Mayor: Bernard Roy
 Councillor 1: Daniel Laplante
 Councillor 2: Roger Moreau
 Councillor 3: Marcel Bérubé
 Councillor 4: Mélanie Normand
 Councillor 5: Monique Potvin
 Councillor 6: Robert Marquis

Saint-Guy
Electors: 97
Voters: 68 (70%)
Councillors 1, 4 and 6 were elected without opposition.
 Mayor: Raynald Roy
 Councillor 1: David Gagnon
 Councillor 2: Bernard Paré
 Councillor 3: Gilles Roussel
 Councillor 4: Bruno Pelletier
 Councillor 5: Jean-Pierre Saucier
 Councillor 6: Stella Paradis

Saint-Honoré-de-Témiscouata
Mayor and councillors 1, 2, 3, 5 and 6 were elected without opposition
 Mayor: Marin Lebel
 Councillor 1: Jean-Guy Ouellet
 Councillor 2: Carole Desbiens
 Councillor 3: Richard Dubé
 Councillor 4: Laurette L. Landry
 Councillor 5: Lionel Rossignol
 Councillor 6: Reno Malenfant

Saint-Hubert-de-Rivière-du-Loup
Mayor and councillors 1, 2 and 3 were elected without opposition
 Mayor: Jacques M.-Martin
 Councillor 1: Alain St-Amand
 Councillor 2: Félicien Beaulieu
 Councillor 3: Nathalie Dionne
 Councillor 4: Napoléon Lévesque
 Councillor 5: Guy St-Pierre
 Councillor 6: Mélanie Leblond

Saint-Jean-de-Cherbourg
All elected without opposition.
 Mayor: Alcide Prévèreau
 Councillor 1: Nathalie Forbes
 Councillor 2: Isabelle Proulx
 Councillor 3: Vacancy
 Councillor 4: Mélisa Henley
 Councillor 5: Hélène Boudreau
 Councillor 6: Chantal Richard

Saint-Jean-de-Dieu
Electors: 1 366
Voters: 654 (48%)
Councillors 1, 2, 3, 5 and 6 were elected without opposition.
 Mayor: Jean-Marie Côté
 Councillor 1: Gervais Talbot
 Councillor 2: Clermont Drapeau
 Councillor 3: Stéphane Rioux
 Councillor 4: Vital Ouellet
 Councillor 5: Robert Rioux
 Councillor 6: Stéphane Rioux

Saint-Jean-de-la-Lande
All elected without opposition.
 Mayor: Nicole St-Pierre
 Councillor 1: Pierrette Pelletier
 Councillor 2: Serge Boulet
 Councillor 3: Martin Dubé
 Councillor 4: Francis Dupuis
 Councillor 5: Lorraine Belzile
 Councillor 6: Mathilda Matteau

Saint-Joseph-de-Kamouraska
Mayor and councillors 1, 2, 3, 5 and 6 were elected without opposition
 Mayor: Sylvain Roy
 Councillor 1: Mario Hudon
 Councillor 2: Yvette Lapointe
 Councillor 3: Albert Lamarre
 Councillor 4: Fernand Ouellet
 Councillor 5: Lucie Briand
 Councillor 6: Raymond Frève

Saint-Joseph-de-Lepage
All elected without opposition.
 Mayor: Réginald Morissette
 Councillor 1: Raymonde Bouchard
 Councillor 2: Magella Roussel
 Councillor 3: Johanne Morissette
 Councillor 4: Alain Thibault
 Councillor 5: Lauréat Dubé
 Councillor 6: Jasmin Couturier

Saint-Juste-du-Lac
All elected without opposition.
 Mayor: Jean-Jacques Bonenfant
 Councillor 1: Guy St-Pierre
 Councillor 2: Rénald Lepage
 Councillor 3: Mario Guimont
 Councillor 4: Jean Bastien Pettigrew
 Councillor 5: Céline Dubé-Ouellet
 Councillor 6: Gilles Michaud

Saint-Léandre
Electors: 363
Voters: 305 (84%)
Councillor 2 was elected without opposition.
 Mayor: Roger Bernier
 Councillor 1: Andrée Blouin
 Councillor 2: Jean-Marie Bérubé
 Councillor 3: Gilles Murray
 Councillor 4: Clarence Levesque
 Councillor 5: Johanne Paquet
 Councillor 6: Éric Levesque

Saint-Léon-le-Grand
Electors: 879
Voters: 517 (59%)
Councillors 2, 5 and 6 were elected without opposition.
 Mayor: Michel McNicoll
 Councillor 1: Aubert Turcotte
 Councillor 2: Léonard Barrette
 Councillor 3: Gabriel St-Laurent
 Councillor 4: Suzanne Ouellet
 Councillor 5: Pierrette Barrette
 Councillor 6: Louisette Bérubé

Saint-Louis-du-Ha! Ha!
Electors: 1 136
Voters: 643 (57%)
Councillors 1 and 4 were elected without opposition.
 Mayor: Donald Viel
 Councillor 1: Louiselle Ouellet
 Councillor 2: Gilles Pelletier
 Councillors 3: Katie Lavoie and Jean-Marc Raymond
 Councillor 4: Simon Bossé
 Councillor 5: Frédéric Beaulieu
 Councillor 6: Janick Rousseau

Saint-Marc-du-Lac-Long
All elected without opposition.
 Mayor: Adrien Kennedy
 Councillor 1: Martine Levesque
 Councillor 2: Marcel Bard
 Councillor 3: Fernand Poliquin
 Councillor 4: Jean-Guy Paquet
 Councillor 5: Marie-Julie Ouellet
 Councillor 6: Rinette Kennedy

Saint-Marcellin
Electors: 381
Voters: 202 (53%)
All councillors were elected without opposition.
 Mayor: Sarto Roy
 Councillor 1: Alice Boucher
 Councillor 2: Raynald Jalbert
 Councillor 3: Paul-Émile Lévesque
 Councillor 4: Lucien Lavoie
 Councillor 5: Jean-Pierre Lechasseur
 Councillor 6: Orietta Roy

Saint-Mathieu-de-Rioux
All elected without opposition.
 Mayor: Norbert Rousseau
 Councillor 1: Réal Côté
 Councillor 2: Jean-Marie Parent
 Councillor 3: Marie-Marthe Fournier
 Councillor 4: Romain Ouellet
 Councillor 5: Gaston Rioux
 Councillor 6: Pierrette Viel

Saint-Médard
All elected without opposition.
 Mayor: Carol Gagnon
 Councillor 1: Raymond Beaulieu
 Councillor 2: Sylvain Ouellet
 Councillor 3: Paul-André Gamache
 Councillor 4: Jean-Nil Gagnon
 Councillor 5: Johanne Rioux
 Councillor 6: Jean-Serge Talbot

Saint-Michel-du-Squatec
Mayor and councillors 3, 5 and 6 were elected without opposition
 Mayor: André Chouinard
 Councillor 1: Raymond Malenfant
 Councillor 2: Gilles Leblond
 Councillor 3: Suzanne Ouellet
 Councillor 4: Jacqueline Caron
 Councillor 5: Chantal Pelletier
 Councillor 6: Jocelyn Patoine

Saint-Modeste
Electors: 827
Voters: 542 (66%)
Councillors 1, 2 and 5 were elected without opposition.
 Mayor: Michel Lebel
 Councillor 1: Margot Ouellet-Perreault
 Councillor 2: Francis Plourde
 Councillor 3: Bruno Castonguay
 Councillor 4: Lucien Gendron
 Councillor 5: Louis-Marie Bastille
 Councillor 6: Alain Boucher

Saint-Moïse
All elected without opposition.
 Mayor: Paul Lepage
 Councillor 1: Jean Plourde
 Councillor 2: Jean-Claude Robichaud
 Councillor 3: Robert Gagné
 Councillor 4: Clément Harvey
 Councillor 5: Nancy Côté
 Councillor 6: Dany Fillion

Saint-Narcisse-de-Rimouski
All elected without opposition.
 Mayor: Gaston Noël
 Councillor 1: Bruno Lebel
 Councillor 2: Benoît Lavoie
 Councillor 3: Raymond Thibault
 Councillor 4: Patrick April
 Councillor 5: Marc-Aurèle Bélanger
 Councillor 6: Florence Bélanger

Saint-Noël
All elected without opposition.
 Mayor: Gilbert Sénéchal
 Councillor 1: Steeve Parent
 Councillor 2: Marcel D'Astous
 Councillor 3: Francine Gagné
 Councillor 4: Gilbert Marquis
 Councillor 5: Jean-Marc Turcotte
 Councillor 6: Jean-Louis Roussel

Saint-Octave-de-Métis
Mayor and councillors 2, 3, 4 and 5 were elected without opposition
 Mayor: Camille Dufour
 Councillor 1: Gabriel Anctil
 Councillor 2: Raymonde Savard
 Councillor 3: Jean-Louis Beaulieu
 Councillor 4: Jacinthe Dubé
 Councillor 5: Yvon Morissette
 Councillor 6: Denis Morin

Saint-Onésime-d'Ixworth
All elected without opposition.
 Mayor: Ghislaine Milliard-Lavoie
 Councillor 1: Alfred Ouellet
 Councillor 2: Isabelle Veilleux
 Councillor 3: Michèle Bond
 Councillor 4: Jean-Marie Dionne
 Councillor 5: Jean-Guy Beaulieu
 Councillor 6: Bertrand Ouellet

Saint-Pacôme
All elected without opposition.
 Mayor: Gervais Lévesque
 Councillor 1: Pauline St-Pierre
 Councillor 2: Donald Boulet
 Councillor 3: Jacques Mayer
 Councillor 4: Sylvain Dubé
 Councillor 5: Carmelle Fortin
 Councillor 6: Jean Santerre

Saint-Pascal
Mayor and councillors 1, 2, 4, 5 and 6 were elected without opposition
 Mayor: Cécile Joseph
 Councillor 1: Renald Bernier
 Councillor 2: Daniel Drapeau
 Councillor 3: Yvan Soucy
 Councillor 4: Francine Soucy
 Councillor 5: Claude Lavoie
 Councillor 6: Rémi Pelletier

Saint-Paul-de-la-Croix
Electors: 329
Voters: 194 (59%)
All councillors were elected without opposition.
 Mayor: Philippe Dionne
 Councillor 1: Sylvain Desmeules
 Councillor 2: Isabelle Lagacé
 Councillor 3: Gilles Sigouin
 Councillor 4: Nancy St-Pierre
 Councillor 5: Robert Lévesque
 Councillor 6: Marie-Jeanne Dubé

Saint-Philippe-de-Néri
Mayor and councillors 1, 3, 4 and 6 were elected without opposition
 Mayor: Gilles Lévesque
 Councillor 1: Michel Dionne
 Councillor 2: Jean-Pierre Bérubé
 Councillor 3: Lise Viens
 Councillor 4: Roland Lévesque
 Councillor 5: Henri Drapeau
 Councillor 6: François Dionne

Saint-Pierre-de-Lamy
All elected without opposition.
 Mayor: Gaston Caron
 Councillor 1: Colette Sirois
 Councillor 2: Émilien Rioux
 Councillor 3: Julie Gagnon
 Councillor 4: Mario Morin
 Councillor 5: Ghislain Labrie
 Councillor 6: Jean-Pierre Ouellet

Saint-René-de-Matane
Electors: 878
Voters: 486 (55%)
Councillors 1, 4 and 5 were elected without opposition.
 Mayor: Jean-Charles Gagnon
 Councillor 1: Steeve Lavoie
 Councillor 2: Berthier Murray
 Councillor 3: Pascal Dufour
 Councillor 4: Madeleine Fillion
 Councillor 5: Dominic Côté
 Councillor 6: Vacancy

Saint-Simon
All elected without opposition.
 Mayor: Jérôme Rouleau
 Councillor 1: Chantale Vaillancourt
 Councillor 2: Lise Théberge
 Councillor 3: André Riou
 Councillor 4: Sylvain Riou
 Councillor 5: Guy Bergeron
 Councillor 6: Réjean Bérubé

Saint-Tharcisius
Electors: 385
Voters: 254 (66%)
Councillors 2, 3 and 5 were elected without opposition.
 Mayor: Rita Rioux
 Councillor 1: Hélène Brochu
 Councillor 2: Michel Ricard
 Councillor 3: Guylaine D'Amours
 Councillor 4: Francis Chenel
 Councillor 5: Cécile Caouette
 Councillor 6: Denis Lavoie

Saint-Ulric
All elected without opposition.
 Mayor: Vacancy
 Councillor 1: Mario Ratté
 Councillor 2: Pierre Thibodeau
 Councillor 3: Serge Gendron
 Councillor 4: Marius Lavoie
 Councillor 5: Annabelle Boulay
 Councillor 6: Francine Bérubé

Saint-Valérien
All elected without opposition.
 Mayor: Ghislain St-Pierre
 Councillor 1: Marie-Josée Collin
 Councillor 2: Michel Michaud
 Councillor 3: Jasmin Michaud
 Councillor 4: Louise Carrier
 Councillor 5: Pierre Latour
 Councillor 6: Jean-François Beaulieu

Saint-Vianney
All elected without opposition.
 Mayor: Georges Guénard
 Councillor 1: Francis Blanchette
 Councillor 2: Stéphanie Blanchette
 Councillor 3: Jean-Philippe Gagnon
 Councillor 4: Raynald Gagnon
 Councillor 5: Reine-Aimée Thibault
 Councillor 6: Julie Gauthier

Saint-Zénon-du-Lac-Humqui
Mayor and councillors 1, 2, 3 and 5 were elected without opposition
 Mayor: Réginald Duguay
 Councillor 1: Édouard Boucher
 Councillor 2: Gérard Carré
 Councillor 3: Jean-Louis Arsenault
 Councillor 4: Ginette Pelletier
 Councillor 5: Normand Henley
 Councillor 6: Gino Canuel

Sayabec
All elected without opposition.
 Mayor: Danielle Marcoux
 Councillor 1: Marie Hallé
 Councillor 2: Jean-Guy Chouinard
 Councillor 3: Suzanne D'Astous
 Councillor 4: Jean-Paul Gaudreault
 Councillor 5: Jocelyn Caron
 Councillor 6: Jean-Yves Thériault

Trois-Pistoles
All elected without opposition.
 Mayor: Jean-Pierre Rioux
 Councillor 1: Daniel Thériault
 Councillor 2: Jacinthe Veilleux
 Councillor 3: Alcide Devost
 Councillor 4: Katleen Hélie
 Councillor 5: Gilbert Larrivée
 Councillor 6: Carl Charron

Val-Brillant
Electors: 813
Voters: 521 (64%)
 Mayor: Marc Bélanger
 Councillor 1: Stevens Turgeon
 Councillor 2: Jocelyne Ouellet
 councillor 3: laurie 
 Councillor 4: Yves Bilodeau
 Councillor 5: Désiré Lizotte
 Councillor 6: Geneviève Leblanc

2005 Quebec municipal elections
History of Bas-Saint-Laurent